Chkalovske settlement territorial hromada is a hromada (territorial community) in Ukraine, in Chuhuiv Raion of Kharkiv Oblast. The administrative center is the urban-type settlement of Chkalovske. Population: 

Chkalovske Amalgamated Hromada was formed on 13 May 2016, according to the decision of Chkalovs'ke rural council "On voluntary unification of territorial communities" and includes seventeen localities: uts. Chkalovske, v. Doslidne, v. Mykolayivka, v. Havrylivka, v. Nova Hnylytsya, v. Ivanivka, v. Mykhaylivka, v. Stepove, v. Studenok, v. Korobochkyne, v. Osykovyy Hay, v. Leb’yazhe, v. Mykolayivka, v. Pushkarne, v. Tahanka, v. Bazaliyivka, v. Yurchenkove of Chuhuyiv district in the Kharkiv region.

At the first election of deputies and a village headman, which was held on 31 July 2016, 26 deputies of Chkalovske rural council and village headman were elected.

Chkalovske settlement hromada is located in the South-Eastern part of Chuhuiv Raion. The Siverskyi Donets flows through the municipality. Chkalovske hromada shares borders with such villages as: v. Volokhiv Yar, v. Hrakove, v. Malynivka, Kochetok.

The administrative and cultural center of the municipality is an urban-type settlement Chkalovs'ke, which is located at a distance of 23 km from  Chuhuyiv and 47 km from the regional center, which is Kharkiv.

Climate
Chkalovske hromada is located in the temperate zone, the climate is temperate continental. Since the community is located in the middle latitudes, the total annual solar radiation varies according to the seasons and is about 95,1 Kcal per cm2, the annual amount of precipitation in form of rain and snow is about 520 mm. In this area North and North-West winds are dominated. The highest temperature (more than +40 °C) was observed in the meteorological station in the city of Chuguev and the lowest was -35 °C. The winter is not very cold here but summer is hot. The climate is more influenced by geographical latitude, altitude above the sea level (700 m), the distance from ocean, the terrain, which surrounds the territory of the region, the nature of the underlying surface. In general, the climate is conducive to human life, the cultivation of various crops and transport work.

Terrain
Chkalovske hromada is located in the central part of Kharkiv region in the forest-steppe zone. The terrain is flat.

Mineral resources
The united community is rich in minerals and natural gas. There are also clays, sandstones, limestones used for the production of building materials (manufacture of bricks in the village of  Lebyazhe). There is an active natural gas production on the territory of Chkalovske hromada.

Internal waters
An integral part of the landscape. On the territory of Chkalovske hromada the internal waters present: the Siverskyi Donets, Burluk, streams, ponds, wetlands and groundwater, they are heavily tied to circumrotation of water. The nature of the catchment of the river belongs to the flat.

Demographic characteristics 
Chkalovske settlement hromada consists of 15 villages and 2 towns with a total population of 12 307 people, namely: •
	The community	2016
1	v. Bazaliyivka	609
2	v. Ivanivka	1008
3	v. Mykhaylivka	187
4	v. Petrivs'ke	64
5	v. Studenok	18
6	v. Korobochkyno	3092
7	v. Osykovyy Hay	102
8	v. Leb’yazhe	1534
9	v. Mykolayivka	28
10	v. Pushkarne	38
11	Tahanka	9
12	v. Yurchenkove	364
13	urban-type settlement Chkalovs'ke	4188
14	v. Mykolayivka	76
15	v. Nova Hnylytsya	472
16	v. Havrylivka	327
17	v. Doslidne	191
The population density per 1 km2 is 47 people. The population growth of Chkalovs'ke amalgamated hromada is due to migration of urban population to rural settlements.
Regions	Area, km2	Population	Population density
Chkalovs'ke amalgamated hromada	261.1	12307	47 per 1 km2
Chuhuyiv district	1148.61	46800	47 per 1 km2
Kharkiv region	31415	2775000	87 per 1 km2

Association of citizens and mass media
On the territory of Chkalovske hromada  the public organization "Chkalovs'ke" "My community" (EDRPOU (National State Registry of Ukrainian Enterprises and Organizations) code 40266500) is registered and functions actively. The number of members consists of 160 people, 60% of the members are women. It represents the interests of all groups of the local population, including vulnerable (especially women, children, pensioners).
There operates a village asset (an organized but not registered  group of local residents aged from 18 to 70 years) on the territory of Chkalovs'ke amalgamated hromada. The village also takes very active part in the life of society and solving problematic issues. Thanks to a friendly and organized cooperation between this group and Chkalovs'ke rural council in 2015-2016 Chkalovs'ke amalgamated hromada was created, also the vital issues were solved.
There operates the veterans organization on the territory of Chkalovs'ke amalgamated hromada. The council consists of 11 members, who are the representatives of all settlements of the amalgamated hromada. In most communities of initiative veterans groups (6 units) are created. This organization is associated with the veterans club "Hope", which has been working for more than 10 years and organizing the reunion for local veterans. There are about 2 625 veterans in the amalgamated hromada.
Chkalovs'ke rural council co-finances the maintenance of the Chuhuiv district broadcasting company "Slobozhanka" and the social-informative newspaper "Herald of Chuhuyivshchyna" of Chuhuiv district.

Education
There are 6 secondary schools on the territory of Chkalovs'ke amalgamated hromada, namely: •
Chkalovs'ke secondary school
Ivanivka secondary school
Korobochkyne secondary school
Leb’yazhe secondary school
Nova Hnylytsya secondary school; •
Bazalivka secondary school.

Medicine
The public institution of health protection "Chuhuiv district center for primary health care" of Chuhuiv district council of the Kharkiv region provides the population with medical services on the territory of Chkalovs'ke amalgamated hromada. In the villages of Chkalovs'ke amalgamated hromada there are its structural units, namely: •
Chkalovs'ke health post of family practice •
Ivanivka health post of family practice •
Korobochkyne health post of family practice •
Leb’yazhe health post of family practice •
Feldsher-midwife station v. Bazaliyivka •
Feldsher-midwife station v. Yurchenkove •
Feldsher-midwife station v. Nova Hnylytsya •
Feldsher-midwife station v. Mykolayivka •
Feldsher-midwife station v. Mykhaylivka •
Feldsher-midwife station v. Stepove
There are four family doctors of general practice who serve 11349 residents of Chkalovs'ke Amalgamated Hromada. In Feldsher-midwife stations of the united community there work  paramedics and nurses who serve 958 people.

Culture
There are five houses of culture on the territory of Chkalovs'ke amalgamated hromada.
Infrastructure.
There are two highways on the territory of Chkalovs'ke amalgamated hromada:  Chuhuiv-Milove and Kyiv-Kharkiv-Dovzhans`kyy. The auto-connect between the settlements of the community passes through local roads that are mostly paved. Also there is a branch of the southern railway.

Economy
Agricultural producers are the key players in the economy of the Chuhuiv region of the Kharkov area, they are located on the territory of Chkalovs'ke amalgamated hromada, PAT "Agricultural complex "Slobozhanskyi" is the largest pork producer in the Kharkiv region.
There operate businesses in such industries as cultivation of plants and agro-processing on the territory of Chkalovs'ke amalgamated hromada:
PAT "Agricultural complex "Slobozhanskyi" (uts Chkalovs'ke),
State enterprise "Experimental farm "Hrakivske" of the National scientific center "Institute of soil science and agricultural chemistry named after A. N. Sokolovskyi"  (v. Doslidne)

Sports club "Vitiaz" (v. Korobochkyne)
TOV "Agro-firm "Ivanivskyi Lan" (v. Ivanivka)
STOV "Maiak" (v. Korobochkyne)
TOV "Agro firm "Lebezhanska" (v. Leb’yazhe)
Private Agricultural Enterprise "Agros" (v. Leb’yazhe)
TOV "Agro firm " Bazaliivskyi kolos" (v. Bazaliyivka)
Subsidiary enterprises "Ahroresurs"(v. Yurchenkove)
Private joint stock company "Chuhuivskyi Ahrotekhservis" (c. Korobochkyne)
TOV "Agro firm "Repina" (v.  Yurchenkove)
TOV "TPK "Ahroalians Ltd."(uts Chkalovs'ke)
Farming enterprise "Merkurii PS" (v. Leb’yazhe)
TOV "Spetsahrodar" (v. Yurchenkove)
TOV "Agroservise Ltd." (v. Ivanivka)

Livestock production and agro-processing
PJSC "Agro complex "Slobozhanskyi" (uts Chkalovs'ke)
Agro firm "Bazaliivskyi kolos" TOV (v. Bazaliyivka)

Gas production
 GPD «Shebelinkagasvydobuvannia»

There  is  a Chuhuiv Observational Station Research Institute of astronomy of Kharkiv National University named after V. N. Karazyn [2] -  the astronomical observatory was founded in 1960, on the territory of Chkalovs'ke amalgamated hromada. The founder of the Observatory was Mykola Pavlovych Barabashov There was organized the laboratory of coherent optics, on the basis of the observing station. The main work subject of the observatory is photometric and spectropolarimetric observations of asteroids.
Entomological reserve of the local value is "Mykhailivskyi". The area is 5,6 hectares. The area is on the South-Western steppe area near the village of Mykhailivka. There grows vegetation of steppe type. There live about 40 types of insects, among which there is the main fertilizer of alfalfa.
Entomological reserve of the local value is "Studentok" The area is 4,9 hectares. The land is on the steppe slopes of the beam near the village of Studenok. The area is 4,9 hectares. There grows steppe vegetation. There live about 50 types and groups of beneficial insects, including pollinators of alfalfa.

References

Hromadas of Kharkiv Oblast
Chuhuiv Raion
2016 establishments in Ukraine